The Marienkirche, Würzburg (Saint Mary's Church) is a chapel located in the inner court of Marienberg Fortress in Würzburg, Bavaria. The first Christian church at this location was built in 706 by Duke Hedan II. The structure of today's building can be traced back to the early 11th century. It is the oldest church in Würzburg and the oldest building in the fortress.

History 
Duke Hedan II erected a small church in the year 706, which was dedicated to the virgin Mary. It was the cathedral and burial site of the Würzburg bishops until the remains of the martyrs Saint Kilian, Saint Colman und Saint Totnan were relocated to the new Würzburg Cathedral on the other side of the Main river in 788. The Marienkirche was officially transferred to St. Burchard's Abbey in 983. 

When  was bishop, he built a new church at this location in the early 11th century, which potentially used some of the original structure and became a pilgrimage church. During the time of  it became the church of the court (Hofkirche) of the princes (Fürsten) of Würzburg in 1200. He made substantial changes to the building, when he increased the height of the cylindrical part and installed larger windows. After a fire in 1600, the building was re-erected by Prince-Bishop Julius Echter. He extendend the presbytery, built a parapet and put a lantern on top of the cuppola, which contains the church bells. The interior was modernised with plasterwork in Renaissance style.

Description

Portal 
The ornamental portal was made from red sandstone, when Julius Echter was bishop, as indicated by his coat of arms. It displays figures of the apostles Saint Peter and Saint Paul, and above them the annunciation and finally the bishops Kilian und Burchard of Würzburg and a madonna. The design is still Renaissance style but already reflects early Baroque influences.

Under Echter's rule, a choir (known as the Echterchor) was also added to the church.

Graves 
Twenty grave plates remain in the centre of the church, which show reliefs of the Würzburg bishops.  The church was the traditional burial place for the prince-bishops' entrails. Their bodies were typically buried at the cathedral and their hearts at Ebrach Abbey.

Bibliography 
 Max Hermann von Freeden: Die Festung Marienberg. Würzburg 1982.
 Flachenecker/Götschmann/Kummer (ed.): Burg. Schloss. Festung. Der Marienberg im Wandel. Mainfränkische Studien 78. Echter, Würzburg 2009. p. 168
 Festung Marienberg. Burgführer mit 41 Farbaufnahmen. Würzburg 2004.

References

External links

Wurzburg Marys
Marys
Wurzburg Marys